Maria Götze (born 24 December 1980) is a retired German Paralympic swimmer.

References

1980 births
Living people
Sportspeople from Chemnitz
Paralympic swimmers of Germany
Swimmers at the 1996 Summer Paralympics
Swimmers at the 2000 Summer Paralympics
Swimmers at the 2004 Summer Paralympics
Swimmers at the 2008 Summer Paralympics
Medalists at the 1996 Summer Paralympics
Medalists at the 2000 Summer Paralympics
Medalists at the 2004 Summer Paralympics
Medalists at the 2008 Summer Paralympics
Paralympic medalists in swimming
Paralympic gold medalists for Germany
Paralympic silver medalists for Germany
Paralympic bronze medalists for Germany
German female freestyle swimmers
German female medley swimmers
German female butterfly swimmers
S6-classified Paralympic swimmers
21st-century German women
20th-century German women